Ternovsky District  is an administrative and municipal district (raion), one of the thirty-two in Voronezh Oblast, Russia. It is located in the northeast of the oblast. Its administrative center is the rural locality (a selo) of Ternovka. Population:  The population of Ternovka accounts for 28.0% of the district's total population.

Within the Ternovsky district there are nature historical and cultural monuments that are protected by the state. These are the churches: Michael the Archangel (1802), Kazan (1861) and Vvedenskaya (1711), and also archaeological: Settlement (4000 BC)

References

Notes

Sources

Districts of Voronezh Oblast